Ajla Hodžić (born 25 January 1980 in Sarajevo, Yugoslavia, presently in Bosnia and Herzegovina) is a Bosnian actress.

Biography 
Hodžić appeared in a variety of film and television projects in her home country. Currently working and residing in Los Angeles, she is a graduate of Wellesly College. She speaks Bosnian, English, Spanish, Italian and Turkish.

Film
Don't Look Up (feature) - Chavi
Broken Angel (feature) - Asli
Walk Hard (feature) - Pierced Lip Girl
Laura (short feature) - Laura

External links

1980 births
Living people
Actresses from Sarajevo
Bosniaks of Bosnia and Herzegovina
Bosnia and Herzegovina film actresses
21st-century Bosnia and Herzegovina actresses